Barium thiocyanate is a colorless water-soluble salt that is very hygroscopic. It is highly toxic to ingestion and irritates the skin. It is also soluble in most alcohols and insoluble in simple alkanes.

Uses
Barium thiocyanate is used in dyeing textiles and is an ingredient in some photographic solutions. But because of its toxicity, it has limited uses.

Preparation
Barium thiocyanate is prepared by dissolving barium metal or barium nitrate in a solution of thiocyanic acid.

References

Thiocyanates
Barium compounds